Turkey Karate Federation (TKF) is the governing body for Karate in Turkey. It aims to govern, encourage and develop the sport for all throughout the country. Karate sport was governed in the 1970s under the Turkish Judo Federation. In 1980, the federation was renamed Judo and Karate. Finally, it became an independent organization in 1990. It is headquartered in Ankara. TKF is a member of the European Karate Federation (EKF).

The federation organizes the national Karate events, and European and World championships hosted by Turkey.

International achievements

Olympics

World Games

World Championships

European Games

European Championships

Champion Karateka
Men
 Haldun Alagaş, World (1990, 1998), European (1991, 1997, 2000)
 Veysel Burgur, World (1992)
 Zeynel Çelik, World (2004), European (1999)
 Zeki Demir, European (2006)
 Enes Erkan, World (2012, 2014), European (2013, 2014), European Games (2015)
 Yücel Gündoğdu, European (2007)
 Aykut Kaya, European (2013)
 Ömer Kemaloğlu, European (2008)
 Hakan Yağlı, European (1994, 1998)
 Uğur Aktaş, European (2016, 2017,2018, 2019, 2021)
 Ali Sofuoğlu, European (2021, 2022)
 Eray Şamdan, European (2021, 2022)
 Burak Uygur, European (2017, 2018, 2022), European Games (2015) 
 Erman Eltemur, European (2022)

Women
 Yıldız Aras, World (2000, 2006), European (2000, 2002, 2003, 2004, 2005, 2007, 2009)
 Hafsa Şeyda Burucu, European (2012, 2013)
 Gülderen Çelik, European (2003, 2007)
 Nurhan Fırat, European (1993, 1997)
 Serap Özçelik,World (2014), European (2011, 2012, 2014, 2018, 2021, 2022)
 Tuba Yakan, European (2013, 2017)
 Merve Çoban, European (2019)
 Meltem Hocaoğlu, European (2021)
 Eda Eltemur, European (2022)

International competitions in Turkey
 2000 European Karate Championships - May 5–7, 2000 Istanbul
 Bosphorus Karate Tournament - April 11–13, 2008 Istanbul
 2015 European Karate Championships - March 19–22, 2015 Istanbul
 2017 European Karate Championships - May 4–7, 2017 İzmit
 2022 European Karate Championships - May 25–29, 2022 Gaziantep

References

External links
 Türkiye Karate Federasyonu official site (Turkish)
 Karate Records

Federation
Karate
Organizations based in Ankara
Sports organizations established in 1981
1981 establishments in Turkey
Karate organizations